Crenella glandula, or the Glandular bean mussel, is a species of bivalve mollusc in the family Mytilidae. It can be found along the Atlantic coast of North America, ranging from Labrador to North Carolina.

References

Mytilidae
Bivalves described in 1834